Lišane Ostrovičke is a village and a municipality in Croatia in the Zadar County. According to the 2001 census, there are 764 inhabitants, 93% of which are Croats.

References

Municipalities of Croatia
Populated places in Zadar County